I Hate You may refer to:

 "I Hate You", a song by Earshot from The Silver Lining, 2008
 "I Hate You", a song written by Irving Berlin
 "I Hate You", a song by Ronnie Milsap from Where My Heart Is, 1973
 "I Hate You", a song by The Stranglers from Suite XVI, 2006
 "I Hate You", a song by Urban Zakapa from 02, 2012
 "I Hate You", a song by Verbal Abuse, 1983
 "I Hate You", a song featured in the film Star Trek IV: The Voyage Home, 1986
 "Platypus (I Hate You)", a song by Green Day from Nimrod, 1997

See also
 I Hate U (disambiguation)
 I Hate Myself (disambiguation)
 Hate You (disambiguation)